The Sceptre of Deception is the third album by Swedish power metal band Falconer, the first with vocalist Kristoffer Göbel and also the first to feature a full band line-up.  The album covers events during the reign of King Birger of Sweden and lengthy strife between him, his brothers, and the Danish and Norwegian crowns.

Track listing
All songs written by Stefan Weinerhall.

There is bonus track on the Japanese version of the album called "The Gate". This songs is unrelated to the concept of the album.

Credits
Kristoffer Göbel - Vocals
Stefan Weinerhall - Guitar
Anders Johansson - Guitar
Peder Johansson - Bass
Karsten Larsson - Drums

Guests
Johannes Nyberg - Keyboards & Backing Vocals
Mathias Blad - Backing & Additional Vocals
Nicklas Olsson - backing & additional lead vocals; last guitar lead on "The Sceptre Of Deception"
Elina Ryd - Backing Vocals
Elize Ryd - Backing Vocals
Fredik Jonsson - Backing Vocals
Thomas Sjölander - Backing Vocals
Andy La Rocque - Lead Guitar on "Hear Me Pray"

Produced by Falconer & Andy La Rocque. Engineered by A. La Rocque at "Los Angered."

References

2003 albums
Falconer (band) albums
Metal Blade Records albums